Holston Valley is an unincorporated community in eastern Sullivan County, Tennessee, United States. Holston Valley is located along U.S. Route 421 and State Route 44 southeast of Bristol.

Education
Schools in Holston Valley are part of the Sullivan County Board of Education.
 Emmett Elementary - grades PreK–5
 Holston Valley Middle - grades 6-8

High school students in Holston Valley attend Sullivan East High School.

References

Unincorporated communities in Tennessee
Unincorporated communities in Sullivan County, Tennessee